Töölö Sports Hall is a sports venue located in the Töölö district of Helsinki, Finland. It was designed by Aarne Hytönen and Risto-Veikko Luukkonen and built in 1935 as Messuhalli (Exhibition Hall). It is located near the Olympic Stadium, the Opera House, and the Sonera Stadium.

The hall was originally a venue for concerts, banquets and sporting events, but is now used only for training and competition in various sports.

History
In preparation for the 1952 Summer Olympics the building was expanded on the northern side.

During the Olympics gymnastics, wrestling, boxing and weightlifting events as well as the basketball finals were held at the venue.

In June 1966 the hot pitch used to fix the hall's roof caught fire. The ensuing blaze almost destroyed the whole building but was eventually extinguished with the help of 175 firemen and the army, the latter of which kept the gathered crowds out of the way.

In 1975 the hall was moved to Helsinki city ownership and got its current name. It is the home arena of the basketball team Torpan Pojat and more recently the Helsinki Seagulls men's basketball team.

The hall is listed by Docomomo as a significant example of modern architecture in Finland.

See also
List of indoor arenas in Finland
List of indoor arenas in Nordic countries

References

External links

 Töölö Sports Hall – City of Helsinki Sports Department
1952 Summer Olympics official report. p. 51.

Sports venues in Helsinki
Indoor arenas in Finland
Buildings and structures in Helsinki
Modernist architecture in Finland
Venues of the 1952 Summer Olympics
Olympic basketball venues
Olympic boxing venues
Olympic gymnastics venues
Olympic weightlifting venues
Olympic wrestling venues
Töölö